Cuth may refer to:

 Cuth, short for Cuthbert, English male given name
 Cuth Harrison (1906–1981), British racing driver
 Cuth Mullins (1873–1938), South African rugby union forward and medical doctor
 Cuth, biblical city also known as Kutha
 CUTH or Confederación Unitaria de Trabajadores de Honduras, Honduran trade union